Academy for Urban Leadership Charter School is a five-year comprehensive public charter  school that serves students in seventh through twelfth grades from Perth Amboy, in Middlesex County, New Jersey, United States. The school operates under the terms of a charter granted by the New Jersey Department of Education. After opening with 100 students in ninth grade in the 2010–11 school year, the school's plans were to add 100 students each year in ninth grade.

As of the 2021–22 school year, the school had an enrollment of 414 students and 39.0 classroom teachers (on an FTE basis), for a student–teacher ratio of 10.6:1. There were 297 students (71.7% of enrollment) eligible for free lunch and 39 (9.4% of students) eligible for reduced-cost lunch.

AUL's first graduating class of 2014 had a graduating percentage of 95% and the second graduating class had a 100% graduation rate. The school started a sports program, with wrestling the only sport that had a varsity and a junior varsity team. The school also offers softball, baseball and basketball. For other sports that were not offered at the school, students could go participate and play for Perth Amboy High School's team.

The school started offering the SAT in its location. It is a college prep school that helps more students graduate and move on to college.

Athletics
The Academy for Urban Leadership Charter School Jaguars compete independently in interscholastic sports under the supervision of the New Jersey State Interscholastic Athletic Association. With 317 students in grades 10-12, the school was classified by the NJSIAA for the 2019–20 school year as Group I for most athletic competition purposes, which included schools with an enrollment of 75 to 476 students in that grade range.

Administration
The school's Lead Administrator is Margaret Rose Morales. Her administration team includes two vice principals.

References

External links 
Academy for Urban Leadership Charter School

Data for Academy for Urban Leadership Charter School, National Center for Education Statistics

2010 establishments in New Jersey
Charter schools in New Jersey
Education in Middlesex County, New Jersey
Educational institutions established in 2010
Perth Amboy, New Jersey
Public high schools in Middlesex County, New Jersey